Andrew Robert Wade (born August 4, 1984) is an American recording engineer and music producer.

Early years and A Wish for Marilynne (2002–2006)

In August 2002, Wade started playing guitar and singing lead vocals in Christian rock/emo band A Wish for Marilynne. By September 2003, the band had written seven songs, three of which made it on to a demo tape, that was recorded four months prior. In an interview with the Ocala Star-Banner the band said that once they had ten songs they were going to start recording, and Wade said "it's (going to) be a lot better than the demo." By this point, the group had performed a total of twelve shows. The band started recording their album, Poetic Chaos, at Wade's The Wade Studio on May 10, 2004, with a projected release date of June.

In June, the band were booking dates for a summer tour with bands A Midnight and May and There for Tomorrow. The band performed at Easy Street in Ocala, Florida on June 3 with bands Starting Over and A Day to Remember, and at The Masquerade in Ocala, Florida on June 20 with bands Inkblot (Cornerstone '04), Vindicated Youth, and Knox Overstreet. In August, the band said on their website that the album would "be ready by the end of summer". Song songs were uploaded to the band's PureVolume account. In December, the band announced recording had finished and release was soon to follow. In February 2005, the band announced that the album, Poetic Chaos, was to be released on March 18. A release show was held Central Christian Church on the same day, featuring bands There For Tomorrow, A Day to Remember, and Starting Over. Song previews were also made available on the band's MySpace account. In early 2006, the band announced they were no longer together.

Record producer (2004–present)
By October 2004, The Wade Studio's equipment was the following: Soundcraft Spirit E8 Mixer, Multicom Pro XL - compressor/limiter/gate, Soundtech ST31EQ - 31 band equalizer, Creative I-Trigue L3500 100 watt monitoring system, Edirol MA-10ABK Stereo Powered Monitors, a variety of plugins, Studiologic velocity-sensitive MIDI controller, Cad M177 condenser mic, Nady SCM900 condenser mic, Shure SM57, 3 CAD TSM411 dynamic drum mics, pair of Apex 170 condenser mics, and a CAD KBM412 large-diameter dynamic kick mic.

Wade, along with Drew Russ, under the name Manly Masculine Men recorded the theme song, "Making History", for the web series that was to support A Day to Remember's Common Courtesy (2013) album. "Making History" was released a single, under the name Manly Masculine Men on October 25.

Artist discography
A Wish for Marilynne
 3-track demo
 Poetic Chaos (2005)

Manly Masculine Men
 "Making History"

Production discography

References
 Footnotes

 Citations

Sources

 

1984 births
Living people
American performers of Christian music
American audio engineers
Record producers from Florida
A Day to Remember